Brian W. Earl is an American basketball coach and former professional basketball player. He is the current head coach for the Cornell Big Red men's basketball team. He previously served nine seasons as an assistant coach for Princeton Tigers men's basketball where he had formerly been team captain and earned three Ivy League championships.

High school
Earl grew up in Medford Lakes, New Jersey and attended Shawnee High School in Medford where he was the 1995 The Philadelphia Inquirer player of the year. He is the younger brother of former All-Big Ten player Dan Earl. Dan became VMI head coach the year before Brian became a head coach. Shawnee never lost a home game during Earl's first three seasons as a starter. Earl was two classes behind his brother at Shawnee and had hoped to join him at Penn State, but Penn State did not recruit him.  Most major programs lost interest in Earl when his play was limited by injury as a junior. His only offers were from Princeton and Penn.

College
He earned Ivy League championships with the 1995–96, 1996–97 and 1997–98 Princeton Tigers.  Earl served as captain of the 1998–99 Princeton Tigers men's basketball team. He was second team all-Ivy for the 1997–98 Tigers and Ivy League Men's Basketball Player of the Year as a senior the following year. His career totals of 113 games started and 281 three-point field goals are Princeton records and stood as Ivy League records until Ryan Wittman totalled 119 and 377 for Cornell in 2010.

Professional career
Following his Princeton career, Earl played professionally in Germany and England as well as in the United States Basketball League and Eastern Basketball Alliance. In 2003, he teamed with Kit Mueller, Arne Duncan, Craig Robinson and Mitch Henderson to make the national 3-on-3 championship game. He served as an assistant coach at for Princeton under former teammates Mitch Henderson and Sydney Johnson from 2007 through 2016. In each of Earl's first four seasons as an assistant, Princeton improved its win total. Earl, who worked mostly with the defense as an assistant, replaced Bill Courtney as head coach for Cornell in 2016 after the school endured six consecutive losing seasons.

Head coaching record

References

1970s births
Living people
Basketball coaches from New Jersey
Basketball players from New Jersey
American expatriate basketball people in Germany
American expatriate basketball people in the United Kingdom
American men's basketball players
Cornell Big Red men's basketball coaches
People from Medford Lakes, New Jersey
Princeton Tigers men's basketball coaches
Princeton Tigers men's basketball players
Shawnee High School (New Jersey) alumni
Sportspeople from Burlington County, New Jersey